is a Japanese actress who is represented by Oscar Promotion. She is best known as Asuna/Ryusoul Pink in the 43rd Super Sentai series Kishiryu Sentai Ryusoulger.

Biography and career
Ichika Osaki was born in Kōchi Prefecture, Japan on December 2, 2000.

In 2012, she won a beauty pageant that won her a spot as a member of the idol group X21. Since then, she has made appearances in commercials and various dramas. The group disbanded in 2018, and Osaki has since continued on her solo career.

In 2019, she joined the cast of Kishiryu Sentai Ryusoulger landing her first major television role as Asuna/Ryusoul Pink.

Filmography

TV dramas

Films

References

External links
 
 
 尾碕真花 - オスカープロモーションプロフィール
 尾碕真花 公式!ブログ｜be amie オスカープロモーション

2000 births
Living people
Japanese television actresses
People from Kōchi Prefecture
Horikoshi High School alumni